Paulo César Pérez (born 18 November 1976 in Rafaela) is a former Argentine footballer.

References

External links 
 

1976 births
Living people
People from Rafaela
Argentine footballers
Association football defenders
Ekstraklasa players
Super League Greece players
Atlético de Rafaela footballers
Widzew Łódź players
Ionikos F.C. players
Tennis Borussia Berlin players
Argentine expatriate footballers
Expatriate footballers in Poland
Expatriate footballers in Greece
Expatriate footballers in Germany
Sportspeople from Santa Fe Province